

The Boeing NB (or Model 21) was a primary training aircraft developed for the United States Navy in 1923. It was a two-bay, equal-span biplane of conventional configuration with interchangeable wheeled and float undercarriage. The pilot and instructor sat in tandem, open cockpits.

The NBs were produced in two batches; the first (NB-1) were powered by radial engines and the second by war-surplus V-8s still in the Navy's inventory. The original prototype evaluated by the Navy had been assessed as being too easy to fly, and therefore of limited use as a trainer. In particular, it was noted that the aircraft was impossible to spin. The NB-1 design attempted to introduce some instability, but it was soon discovered that while it was now possible to get the aircraft into a spin, it was virtually impossible to recover from one. A series of modifications were made to attempt a compromise.

Variants

 VNB-1 - prototype (one built)
 NB-1 - original production machine with Lawrance J-1 radial engine (41 built)

 NB-2 - production machine with Wright-Hispano E engine (30 built)
 NB-3 - one NB-1 with lengthened fuselage and modified empennage to improve handling, and Hispano-Suiza E engine. Later refitted to standard NB-1 
 NB-4 - one NB-1 converted similar to NB-3, but with Lawrance J-1 engine. Later refitted to standard NB-1

Operators

United States Navy

Peruvian Naval Aviation (NB-1)

Specifications (NB-1)

References

 
 

1920s United States military trainer aircraft
NB